{{DISPLAYTITLE:Mu1 Gruis}}

Mu1 Gruis, Latinized from μ1 Gruis, is a binary star system in the southern constellation of Grus. It is visible to the naked eye with a combined apparent visual magnitude of 4.79. The distance to this system, as determined using an annual parallax shift of 11.44 mas as seen from the Earth, is around 275 light years. It is drifting closer with a heliocentric radial velocity of −5 km/s.

The pair orbit each other with a period of 19 years and an eccentricity of 0.56. The yellow-hued primary component is an evolved giant star with stellar classification of G III and visual magnitude 5.20. With the supply of hydrogen at its core exhausted, it cooled and expanded; at present it has nine times the girth of the Sun. The star is radiating 67 times the luminosity of the Sun from its enlarged photosphere at an effective temperature of 5,422 K.

The secondary component is magnitude 6.68 and classed as a G-type star, although its color index and absolute magnitude suggest it is of type A6.

References

G-type giants
Binary stars
Grus (constellation)
Gruis, Mu1
Durchmusterung objects
211088
109908
8486